Hum Kisise Kum Naheen is a 1977 Indian musical drama film produced and directed by Nasir Hussain. It took the third top spot at the box office in 1977. The film stars 
Rishi Kapoor, Tariq Khan, Kaajal Kiran, Amjad Khan and Zeenat Aman in Sp.App.

Cast 
 Rishi Kapoor as Rajesh/Fake Manjeet Kumar Dana
 Zeenat Aman as Sunita (Special Appearance)
 Tariq Khan as Sanjay Kumar
 Kaajal Kiran as Kajal Kisharina
 Amjad Khan as Saudagar Singh
 Om Shivpuri as Ram Kumar
 Murad as Rajesh's Father
 Tom Alter as Jack
 Ajit Khan as Sunita's Father
 Kamal Kapoor as Kishorilal
 Vimal Ahuja

Plot 

The story begins with a wealthy man selling his entire estate in Africa, converting it to diamonds. He carries them in a belt and takes a flight to India. On the way, he suffers a fatal heart attack in the washroom, whilst in the throes of which, he requests a co-passenger to deliver the belt with diamonds to his son, Rajesh, who works in Ashoka Hotel, Delhi, as a singer-dancer-entertainer. The co-passenger happens to be a rich businessman named Kishorilal.

A few years ago when motherless Kajal's father Kishorilal was in a deep financial crisis, Sanjay's father gave shelter to him, who has now become extremely rich. The promise of getting Sanjay and Kajol married is forgotten when Kishorilal insults them and forgets the promise that was made years previously. 

Almost immediately, Kishorilal is chased by goons who are after the diamonds. He escapes them temporarily and flies to Delhi, but finds them waiting for him as he exits the airport. Running from them, he enters a cycle shed (a parking place for bicycles), stashes the belt in the toolbox of a bicycle, and hides out of sight. The bicycle belongs to Sanjay Kumar, who is unaware that his bicycle has 25 crore rupees worth of diamonds hidden in its toolbox, and rides away with the bike before Kishorilal can see who he is. Saudagar Singh  is actually the one on whose behalf those goons were after the diamonds. His plans having been thwarted as described above, Saudagar Singh and his partner Baljit Kumar Dana set a trap for Rajesh telling a false story to him about Kishorilal having kidnapped Saudagar Singh's son, Ramesh. Taken in by their story, Rajesh hatches a plot to spirit away Kishorilal's daughter, Kajal, by pretending to be in love with her, and, once he has her in her clutches, to thereby extorting the diamonds back from Kishorilal. Sanjay becomes Manjeet's manager and Sanjay pretends as Rajesh is to fall in love with Kajal, who is in love with her childhood love, Sanjay. They meet once before the scheme is discovered by Rajesh. There is a series of meetings between the Rajesh and Kajal. Sanjay becomes Manjeet's manager. Saudagar uses Manjeet to get the diamonds himself in the climax, who brings them along with Kajal. However, she gets rescued by Rajesh and Sanjay, who escape with her. After a fight at the country border, in which all of Saudagar's daicots are defeated, Sanjay gets shot by Saudagar. After threatening Kajal, Sanjay, who is alive, shoots Saudagar dead before the police save them. Sanjay and Kajal become a couple, as do Rajesh and his ex, who escaped from her own wedding to be with him.

Special effects 
Special effects were added by Rauko Effects Service.

Soundtrack 

The soundtrack was composed by R. D. Burman. It included nine original songs.

The song "Bachna Ae Haseeno" sung by Kishore Kumar was one of the biggest chart-busters of 1977 and was the title of film produced by Yash Chopra Films in 2007.

The song "Kya Hua Tera Vada" won Mohd Rafi both filmfare best male playback singer and National film award.

This film was released at a time when the Swedish pop group ABBA were at the peak of their popularity all over the world, including in India. One of their songs "Honey Honey" was featured in the movie, playing in the background just before the song "Kya Hua Tera Waada" begins. The song "Mil Gaya Humko Saathi" that is sung by Kajal during the competition is heavily inspired from the ABBA smash hit song "Mamma Mia."

The music songs was composed by Rahul Dev Burman and the lyrics were penned by Majrooh Sultanpuri.

Awards

25th National Film Awards:
 Best Male Playback Singer – Mohammed Rafi for "Kya Hua Tera Vaada"

 25th Filmfare Awards:
Won
 Best Male Playback Singer – Mohammed Rafi for "Kya Hua Tera Vaada"
 Best Cinematography – Munir Khan
 Best Art Direction – Shanti Dass
Nominated
 Best Supporting Actor – Tariq
Best Music Director – R. D. Burman
Best Lyricist – Majrooh Sultanpuri for "Kya Hua Tera Wada"
 Best Female Playback Singer – Sushma Shreshta for "Kya Hua Tera Wada"

References

External links 
 

1977 films
1970s Hindi-language films
Films scored by R. D. Burman
Indian dance films
Films directed by Nasir Hussain